Jean Flipart may refer to:
 Jean Charles Flipart, French engraver
 Jean Jacques Flipart, his son, French engraver